Tetranitrogen is a neutrally charged polynitrogen allotrope of the chemical formula  and consists of four nitrogen atoms. The tetranitrogen cation is the positively charged ion, which is more stable than the neutral tetranitrogen molecule and is thus more studied.

History
Polynitrogen compounds have been well known and characterized by chemists for many years. The commonplace molecular (diatomic) nitrogen was first isolated by Daniel Rutherford in 1772 and the azide ion was discovered by Theodor Curtius in 1890. Discoveries of other related nitrogenous allotypes during the twentieth century include the aromatic molecule pentazole and  the radical molecule . However, none of these complexes could be isolated or synthesized on a macroscopic scale like  and azide; it was not until 1999 that a large scale synthesis was devised for a third nitrogen allotrope, the pentazenium cation. This increased interest in polynitrogen compounds in the late twentieth century was due to the advance of computational chemistry which predicted that these types of molecules could be used as potential high-energy-density matter (HEDM) sources.

Theoretical chemistry predicted several possible synthesis mechanisms for  including reaction of a neutral N atom with a  radical, binding of two  molecules in the excited state, and extrusion from polycyclic compounds, none of which could be accomplished experimentally. However, in 2002 a method for synthesis of tetranitrogen was devised from the deionization of  through neutralization-reionization mass spectrometry (NRMS). In the synthesis,  (which was first formed in the ionization chamber of the mass spectrometer) underwent two high energy collision events. During the first collision,  contacted a target gas, to yield a small percentage of neutral  molecules.

 +  →  + 

A deflecting electrode was used to remove any unreacted  ions as well as the target gas, and any additional unintended reaction products, leaving a stream of  molecules.

 +  →  + 

Because the "flight time" between the two reactions, carried out in separate chambers of the mass spectrometer, was on the order of 1 μs, the  molecule has a lifetime of at least this long.

Characteristics
Since its discovery,  has not been well studied. It is a gas at room temperature. It also has a lifetime in excess of 1 μs, though it is predicted to be characterized as metastable. Due to its instability, the N4 molecule readily disassociates into two more-stable N2 molecules. This process is very exothermic, releasing around 800 kJ mol−1 of energy.

Ab initio calculations in the neutral molecular suggest that previously proposed rectangular or tetrahedral structures, analogous to cyclobutadiene and tetrahedrane, respectively, are not likely to be the most thermodynamically stable. Instead, the ground state is expected to be a bent or zig-zag linear chain of the four nitrogen atoms containing two unpaired electrons on one of the terminal nitrogen atoms—essentially an azido-nitrene.

The structure of  has been predicted by theoretical experiments and confirmed by experimental techniques involving collisionally activated dissociation mass spectrometry (CADMS). This technique bombards -producing fragments which can then be analyzed by tandem mass spectrometry. Based on the fragments observed, a structure was determined invlvolving two pairs of triple-bonded nitrogen atoms (two  units) that are associated with each other with a longer, weaker bond.

Applications
Tetranitrogen and other similar polynitrogen compounds are predicted to be good candidates for use as high-energy-density matter (HEDM), high energy fuel sources with small weight in comparison with traditional liquid and fuel cell-based energy sources. Because of this, polynitrogen molecules are expected to readily break down into harmless  gas, in the process releasing large amounts of chemical energy. This is in contrast to carbon containing compounds which have lower energies of formation for an equivalent number of single or double bonds than for a C≡C triple bond, allowing for the thermodynamically favorable formation of polymers. It is for this reason that the only allotropic form of nitrogen found in nature is molecular nitrogen and why novel strategies of synthesizing polynitrogen allotropes in a cost-efficient manner are so highly sought after.

See also
 Hexazine (nitrogen allotrope with formula N6)
 Octaazacubane (nitrogen allotrope with formula N8)
 Tetraphosphorus, a.k.a. white phosphorus
 Tetraarsenic (a.k.a. "yellow arsenic")
 Tetraoxygen
 Tetrahedrane, tetrahedral hydrocarbon

References

Allotropes of nitrogen